The 2014 Nor.Ca. Men's Handball Championship was the first edition of the Nor.Ca. Men's Handball Championship, held in Mexico City, Mexico from 25 February to 1 March 2014.

Standings

Results
All times are local (UTC−6).

References

External links
Results on todor66.com

2014 Men
Nor.Ca. Men's Handball Championship
Nor.Ca. Men's Handball Championship
Nor.Ca. Men's Handball Championship
February 2014 sports events in Mexico
March 2014 sports events in Mexico